Donald C. Cook Nuclear Plant is a nuclear power plant located just north of the city of Bridgman, Michigan which is part of Berrien County, on a  site 11 miles south of St. Joseph, Michigan, United States.  The plant is owned by American Electric Power (AEP) and operated by Indiana Michigan Power, an AEP subsidiary.  It has two nuclear reactors and is currently the company's only nuclear power plant.

The construction cost of the power plant was $3.352 billion (2007 USD). The plant produces 2.2 GW of electricity, enough to meet the needs of a city with 1.25 million people.

The plant is connected to the power grid via one 765 kV line that goes from the plant to AEP's DuMont substation near Lakeville, Indiana and by numerous 345 kV lines, two of which interconnect with METC, connecting with the Palisades Nuclear Generating Station, owned by Entergy.

License expiration and renewal
The US Nuclear Regulatory Commission renewed the operating licenses of both reactors on August 30, 2005. With the renewal, Unit One's operating license will expire in 2034 while Unit Two's will expire in 2037. The units were initially licensed for forty years from their operational date.

Electricity Generation 
Donald C. Cook generated 17,953 GWh in 2021.

Surrounding population

The 2010 U.S. population within  of D.C. Cook was 54,638, an increase of 3.4 percent in a decade, according to an analysis of U.S. Census data for msnbc.com. The 2010 U.S. population within  was 1,225,096, an increase of 2.8 percent since 2000. Cities within 50 miles include South Bend, IN (26 miles to city center), Michigan City, IN, St. Joseph, MI, and Kalamazoo, MI.

Visitors center
The plant has a visitors center that was open to the public six days a week on a drop in basis.  Since the attacks of September 11, however, the plant is open only to school groups by reservation.  The visitors center features a  animated model demonstrating how the plant operates.

Ownership
The plant is operated by the Indiana Michigan Power Company and owned by American Electric Power.

Incidents

In 1976 two workers were killed in a recirculation pit (sump) by asphyxiation from argon inerting gas used to support welding on stainless steel piping.
 July 13, 1990 one person was killed by electrocution and three others suffered severe burn injuries from a 4kv switchgear explosion.
In September, 1997, both units were shut down for approximately three years when, as a result of NRC inspections in the engineering area, it became unclear whether emergency core cooling systems could perform their intended functions in the event of a design basis accident.
In 1998 the NRC imposed a $500,000 civil penalty for 37 regulatory violations, mostly concerning the containment ice condenser used in responding to some loss-of-coolant accidents.
On May 12, 2002, Unit 2 was automatically shut down due to the failure of both redundant DC power supplies in the Reactor Control & Instrumentation System.  Due to inadequate corrective actions, the same event occurred on February 5, 2003.
A transformer fire caused an automatic shutdown of Unit 1 in 2003 and release of cooling oil to Lake Michigan.
A massive intrusion of fish caused both units to be manually shut down for several weeks on April 24, 2003.  Due to the degradation in Essential Service Water flow to the plants' Emergency Diesel Generators, the site entered the Emergency Plan at the Alert level.  The Alert was exited approximately 25 hours later.
On September 20, 2008 unit 1's main turbine and generator were damaged by severe turbine vibrations caused by broken low-pressure turbine blades. A fire also broke out in the generator of Unit 1.  No radiation was released and Unit 2 continued to operate at full power.
The plant's Unit 2 reactor was shut on October 12, 2020. American Electric Power Company Inc. said service was suspended from the 1,168 megawatt (MW) unit when it tripped due to lowering water level in one of the plant’s four steam generators.
In the late night hours of June 22, 2021, operators discovered a leak in a high pressure steam line providing non-radioactive steam to the low pressure turbines of unit 2. The leak appeared to grow larger as it was monitored, leading to a manual shutdown of unit 2. A plant spokesman stated that an assessment is underway to determine the cause of the steam leak and develop a repair timeline, however, I&M does not release return-to-service projection information for generation units for competitive reasons. Meanwhile, unit 1 continued to operate at full capacity with no interruption of power to customers.
An "unusual event" was detected at 10:44 A.M on January 6, 2022. According to an alert from the United States Nuclear Regulatory Commission, a potential fire was detected, but there was no fire.

Seismic risk
The Nuclear Regulatory Commission's estimate of the risk each year of an earthquake intense enough to cause core damage to the reactor at D.C. Cook was 1 in 83,333, according to an NRC study updated in June 2018.

Additional information

See also

List of largest power stations in the United States

References

External links

Aerial photos of the Cook plant
Cook Nuclear Power Plant Page
U.S. Nuclear Regulatory Commission Information Page for Unit 1
U.S. Nuclear Regulatory Commission Information Page for Unit 2

Energy infrastructure completed in 1975
Energy infrastructure completed in 1978
Buildings and structures in Berrien County, Michigan
Nuclear power plants in Michigan
Nuclear power stations using pressurized water reactors
1975 establishments in Michigan
American Electric Power